Fairfield Sun Times is a weekly newspaper serving Fairfield, Montana and surrounding towns Choteau, Augusta, Vaughn, Power, Simms, Ft. Shaw and Sun River. Its circulation area encompasses parts of Teton County, Cascade County and Lewis and Clark County.

History
It started as the Fairfield Times in 1912.

References

External links

Newspapers published in Montana
Newspapers established in 1912
1912 establishments in Montana